Carr Run is a  long 3rd order tributary to Cussewago Creek in Crawford County, Pennsylvania.

Course
Carr Run rises about 1.5 miles east of Springboro, Pennsylvania, and then flows north then southeast to join Cussewago Creek about 1.5 miles west of Mosiertown, Pennsylvania.

Watershed
Carr Run drains  of area, receives about 45.6 in/year of precipitation, has a wetness index of 508.61, and is about 47% forested.

See also
 List of rivers of Pennsylvania

References

Rivers of Pennsylvania
Rivers of Crawford County, Pennsylvania